Danilo Luis Baroni (July 12, 1922 – June 9, 2014) was an Argentine lawyer and politician. Baroni, a member of the Justicialist Party, served as the Governor of Chaco Province from December 10, 1987, until December 10, 1991. 

Baroni died in Resistencia, Chaco, Argentina, on June 9, 2014, at the age of 92.

References

1922 births
2014 deaths
Governors of Chaco Province
20th-century Argentine lawyers
Justicialist Party politicians